Iron(II) perchlorate is a salt of iron and has the appearance of a green crystal.

Uses
It is used in the process of manufacturing batteries and also used in pyrotechnics.

References

Iron(II) compounds
Perchlorates